Network file system may refer to:
 A distributed file system, which is accessed over a computer network
 Network File System (protocol), a specific brand of distributed file system